Mitella trifida is a species of flowering plant in the saxifrage family known by the common names threeparted miterwort and Pacific miterwort. It is native to western North America from Alaska to Montana to California, where it grows in wet wooded habitat types. It is a rhizomatous perennial herb growing up to about 45 centimeters tall. The leaves occur around the base of the stem. They have rounded blades up to 10 centimeters wide and lobed, round-toothed edges. The erect inflorescence bears up to 20 flowers, usually along one side of the stem. The distinctive flower is cup-shaped with five white or violet-tinged petals which are usually, but not always, divided into three lance-shaped lobes.

External links

Jepson Manual Treatment
Photo gallery

trifida
Flora of Alaska
Flora of Western Canada
Flora of the Western United States
Flora without expected TNC conservation status